The King and I is the 1992 studio cast recording of the musical play conducted by John Mauceri of the Hollywood Bowl Orchestra and starring Julie Andrews (Anna), Ben Kingsley (the King), Lea Salonga (Tuptim), Peabo Bryson (Lun Tha), and Marilyn Horne (Lady Thiang).

Three songs not used in the 1956 film were restored: "Shall I Tell You What I Think of You" (for Anna); "My Lord and Master" (for Tuptim); and "I Have Dreamed" (for Lun Tha and Tuptim).

The King & I: Recording a Hollywood Dream was a 1993 PBS documentary about the making of the recording.

References

External links
 

Cast recordings
1992 albums

Rodgers and Hammerstein
The King and I